Sir Henry Churchill Maxwell Lyte (or Maxwell-Lyte)  (29 May 1848 – 28 October 1940) was an English historian and archivist. He served as Deputy Keeper of the Public Records from 1886 to 1926, and was the author of numerous books including a history of Eton College.

Family

Maxwell Lyte was born on 29 May 1848 in London, to John Walker and Emily Jeanette Maxwell-Lyte. He was the grandson of Henry Francis Lyte. He was educated at Eton College and at Christ Church, Oxford, taking an Honours degree(s) in Law and History, and becoming an M.A. He married Frances Fownes Somerville on 3 January 1871 in Wells, Somerset. Their children were Agnes (22 October 1871); Edith (30 October 1872); Margaret (27 March 1874); John (15 June 1875); Walter (4 March 1877); and Arthur (10 April 1881), who went on, after education at Eton and Magdalen College, Oxford, to be assistant secretary of the Board of Education in 1936.

Early career

Maxwell Lyte published his first book, A History of Eton College, in 1875. In 1880 and 1881 he wrote a series of papers on Dunster and its Lords for the Archaeological Journal, which were later reprinted as a book. In 1886, he published History of the University of Oxford from the earliest times to the year 1530. For several years Maxwell Lyte was an inspector of the Royal Commission on Historical Manuscripts.

In 1886, he was appointed Deputy Keeper of the Public Record Office (PRO) in succession to William Hardy. As a newcomer, he was initially resented by the staff of the office, but quickly asserted his authority. He reformed the clerks' pay structure, began plans for a permanent museum, organised a project to celebrate 800 years since production of the Domesday Book and in 1889 introduced a lift and electric lights  in the building. Despite public opposition, he demolished the Rolls Chapel to make room for an extension along Chancery Lane, incorporating the chancel arch, stained glass and monuments in the museum.

In 1890 Maxwell Lyte went to Rome and drew up the rules for formation of a Calendar of Papal Registers, starting with those of Pope Innocent III. Reviewers later criticised the omission of these rules from the Calendar, which reduced its value to researchers.

The PRO had been publishing the Rolls Series, critically edited versions of selected texts in the Record Office. Although many were of great value, there were failures and a sense of amateurishness in some of the publications. Maxwell Lyte was influential in the decision to transfer editors and funding from work on the series to the more valuable work of publishing public records. In 1892 he introduced the Lists and Indexes series. By terminating the Rolls Series in 1894 and concentrating on making guides and calendars to the records, which professional historians could now access directly, Maxwell Lyte transformed the Record Office into a centre of scholarship. He was instrumental in the passage of an Act of Parliament in 1898 that allowed for destruction of records of little apparent value back to 1660.

Later career

In 1908, Maxwell Lyte arranged for a new Guide to the contents of the PRO. In 1910 he became engaged in a struggle to prevent records on Wales being transferred there, refusing to co-operate with a commission set up for this purpose. In 1914, as Deputy Keeper of the Public Records, he opposed reduction of controls over access to the public records.
Although personally in favour of giving the public access to documents up to 1860, for later records he recommended that each case be subject to an inquiry about the purpose and extent of the research. His concern was that the researcher might publish distorted and damaging work based on a biased selection, and could even be in the pay of foreign powers. During the planning of the National War Museum in 1917, as keeper of the Public Record Office he decided against giving custody of War Records to the museum. In 1924 he was appointed chairman of a committee established by the British Academy to prepare a dictionary of Medieval Latin based on British sources dating between 1066 and 1600.

Maxwell Lyte was made a Companion of the Bath in January 1889 and a Knight Companion of the Bath in 1897. He retired from the PRO in 1926, and was succeeded by A. E. Stamp. He died on 28 October 1940 in Dinder House, Dinder, Somerset.

Bibliography

; 2nd edition, 1889; 4th edition, 1911

References

Source bibliography 

 
 
 
 
 
 
  (republished Taylor & Francis)
 
 
 

 

1848 births
1940 deaths
People educated at Eton College
Alumni of Christ Church, Oxford
19th-century English historians
English archivists
People associated with The National Archives (United Kingdom)
English male non-fiction writers
Knights Commander of the Order of the Bath
Fellows of the British Academy
20th-century English historians